This is a list of Libertarian Party of Virginia statewide and federal candidates.

Candidates

Bill Redpath
Bill Redpath ran in Virginia's 34th House of Delegates district (1993), Virginia's 33rd Senate district (1998), Virginia gubernatorial election, 2001, Virginia U.S. Senate election, 2008, and in Virginia's 10th congressional district (2010 and 2014).

Ron Crickenberger
Ron Crickenberger was national political director of the United States Libertarian Party from 1997 until his death from metastatic melanoma in 2003. He also ran for Congress in Virginia's 8th congressional district in 2000 and 2002. Crickenberger focused the party's efforts on drug policy reform, and in 2002, police forcibly removed him and several other protestors from the Department of Justice building after they refused to cooperate. Crickenberger also conducted a successful drive to encourage more Libertarians to run for public office, with the number of Libertarians holding elected office more than tripled, from 180 to about 600.

Gary Reams
Gary Reams, a Quaker and former Democrat, ran for U.S. House in the 10th congressional district on a platform calling for downsizing the federal government. He ran in the Virginia lieutenant gubernatorial election, 2001 on a platform calling for cannabis legalization.

Robert Sarvis
Robert Sarvis ran in Virginia's 35th Senate district election (2011), in the Virginia gubernatorial election, 2013, and in the United States Senate election in Virginia, 2014.

Cliff Hyra
Clifford D. "Cliff" Hyra (born September 3, 1982) is an American patent attorney and politician. In 2007 Cliff Hyra graduated from George Mason University School of Law and became a registered patent attorney who is licensed to practice in Virginia and the District of Columbia.

The Libertarian Party nominated Cliff Hyra by convention on May 6, 2017 for the 2017 Virginia gubernatorial election after he collected the 10,000 signatures that he needed. After being denied entry into the Virginia governor debates Hyra chose to watch the debate remotely and refused to take the seat the bar offered him in the VIP area at the 90-minute debate.

References

Libertarian Party (United States) by state